BC UNICS is a professional basketball club in Kazan, Russia, that plays in the VTB United League, and formerly played in the EuroLeague. On February 28, 2022, EuroLeague Basketball suspended the team because of the 2022 Russian invasion of Ukraine.

Their home arena is Basket-Hall Kazan.

History

1991-1999
UNICS was established in 1991.  Though officially the club's men's professional club was founded in 1991 (when it first began to play in the lowest level of the national pro leagues), UNICS traces its origins back to KSU's college team Burevestnik, which participated in the USSR student championships from 1957. Because of this, the name 'UNICS' is an abbreviation – UNIversity, Culture, Sport. 

Between 1994 and 1997, UNICS secured a berth in Russia's first division.  In 1997, UNICS was promoted to the Russian Basketball Super League A, which was at the time the top-tier level Russian league. A year later, Yevgeny Bogachev, the chairman of the National Bank of the Tatarstan, became the president of the club.

2000-2019
The team placed second to CSKA in the Russian Basketball Super League in 2001 and 2002, a year in which it also reached the Saporta Cup semifinals, losing against the Greek club Maroussi in the semifinals. UNICS' first title was the Russian Cup in March 2003, with an 81–82 overtime victory over CSKA. Kazan hosted the FIBA Europe League final four, which was eventually named the FIBA EuroChallenge, in April 2004. UNICS won its regular season group, and advanced to the final four, where the club was crowned the FIBA Europe League champions. The MVP of the tournament's final four. By the 2005–06 season, UNICS went one level up, and made its ULEB Cup (later named EuroCup) debut. However, things turned south quickly, as UNICS lost at home against Roma in the tournament's eighth finals’ second leg, and crashed out. The team the next season made it to the ULEB Cup semifinals, before losing to the eventual league champs Real Madrid. It also returned to the Russian League finals, losing against CSKA.

In the 2007–08 season, UNICS made it to the ULEB Cup (now called EuroCup) Final Eight, but fell to Akasvayu Girona in the quarterfinals. UNICS finally broke through in the EuroCup in the 2010–11 season, by winning its regular season and Last 16 groups, before sweeping its quarterfinal series against Pepsi Caserta. UNICS beat KK Cedevita 87–66, in the semifinals, behind 27 points from Terrell Lyday, and registered a 92–77 win against Cajasol Sevilla, in the title game. Marko Popović had a EuroCup Finals record of 11 assists, to lead UNICS to the title. In the Russian League, UNICS had a 21–6 record, to finish the regular season atop the standings, but then went out in the playoff semifinals, after a five-game duel against BC Khimki. The club then competed in the Turkish Airlines EuroLeague in the following season. It made its EuroLeague debut in the 2011–12 season. In the Russian League it finished first at the end of the regular season, and reached the playoff semifinals.

2020-present
Jarrell Brantley left the team in early 2022 due to the 2022 Russian invasion of Ukraine. The team is suing him for $250,000, and trying to prevent him from signing with a G League team. Similarly, Americans Lorenzo Brown, Isaiah Canaan, John Brown, and John Holland, as well as Italian Marco Spissu,  left the team after the invasion.

On February 28, 2022, EuroLeague Basketball suspended the team because of the 2022 Russian invasion of Ukraine.

Honours

Domestic competitions
 VTB United League
 Runners-up (2): 2015–16, 2020–21
Russian Cups
Champions (3): 2003, 2009, 2014

European competitions

EuroCup
Champions (1): 2011
EuroChallenge
Champions (1): 2004
North European League
Champions (1): 2003

Season by season

Players

Current roster

Depth chart

Notable players

bold – FIBA World and FIBA Europe champions and medalists

Russian
 
 Ruslan Avleev (1997–01, 04–06) – 301 games, 19.2 ppg;
 Petr Samoylenko (1998–07, 08–13) – 774 games, 5.8 ppg;
 Alexander Petrenko (1999–00) – 58 games, 13.2 ppg;
 Evgeniy Pashutin (2000–02) – 86 games, 8.5 ppg;
 Valentin Kubrakov (2000–02, 03–04) – 121 games, 8.5 ppg;
 Igor Kudelin (2002–03, 06–07) – 35 games, 8.1 ppg; 
 Sergei Chikalkin (2002–03, 05–09) – 187 games, 10.6 ppg;
 Andrei Fetisov (2002–03) – 20 games, 6.2 ppg;
 Viktor Keirou (2003–05, 07–08) – 83 games, 5.4 ppg;
 Vadim Panin (2006–07) – 35 games, 6.1 ppg;
 Dmitri Sokolov (2006–09) – 128 games, 6.8 ppg;
 Nikolay Padius (2007–08, 10–11) – 59 games, 5.3 ppg;
 Fedor Likholitov (2009–10) – 10 games, 2.5 ppg;
 Zakhar Pashutin (2010–12) – 102 games, 4.3 ppg;
 Aleksey Savrasenko (2011–12) – 56 games, 4.6 ppg;
 Nikita Shabalkin (2012–13) – 28 games, 6.3 ppg;
  Egor Koulechov (2020-21)

Foreign
bold – former NBA players; Olympics, FIBA World and FIBA Europe champions and medalists

 
USA
 Glen Whisby (2000–01) – 51 games, 10.4 ppg;
 Anthony Bonner (2001–02) – 8 games, 14.9 ppg;
 Michael McDonald (2001–02) – 45 games; 12.2 ppg;
 Acie Earl (2001–02) – 30 games, 11.8 ppg;
 Dickey Simpkins* (2002–03) – 38 games, 12.3 ppg;
 Kebu Stewart (2002–03) – 18 games, 8.3 ppg;
 LaMarr Greer (2003–04) – 41 games; 12 ppg;
 Joe Ira Clark (2004–05) – 41 games, 7.8 ppg;
 Paul Shirley (2004–05) – 9 games, 4.9 ppg;
 Shammond Williams (2004–05) – 57 games, 17.1 ppg;
 Travis Best (2005–06) – 40 games, 11.5 ppg;
 Samaki Walker* (2005–06) – 4 games, 7 ppg;
 Sam Clancy, Jr. (2005–06) – 30 games, 4 ppg;
 Jarod Stevenson (2006–07) – 32 games; 10.4 ppg;
 Mateen Cleaves (2006–07) – 11 games, 5 ppg;
 Jerry McCullough (2006–08) – 80 games, 6.8 ppg;
 Tariq Kirksay (2007–09) – 95 games, 9.3 ppg;
 Joseph Forte (2007–08) – 11 games, 8.4 ppg;
 Marc Jackson (2008–09) – 19 games, 6.5 ppg;
 Terrell Lyday (2008–13) – 243 games, 12.2 ppg;
 Ricky Minard (2010–11) – 48 games, 7.4 pts;
 Kelly McCarty (2010–13) – 114 games, 9.5 ppg;
 Henry Domercant (2011–12) – 58 games, 13.4 ppg;
 Lynn Greer (2011–12) – 55 games, 8 ppg;
 Mike Wilkinson (2011–13) – 63 games, 7.1 ppg;
 Mire Chatman (2012–13) – 45 games, 8.5 ppg;
 Chuck Eidson (2012–13) – 48 games, 13.6 ppg;
 Drew Goudelock (2013–14) – 46 games, 19.3 ppg;
Australia
 Chris Anstey (2003–05) – 93 games, 13.1 ppg;
 Nathan Jawai (2011–12) – 46 games, 8.7 ppg;

Europe
 Slobodan Šljivančanin (1998–00) – 117 games, 10 ppg;
 Branislav Vićentić (2001–02) – 29 games, 10.4 ppg;
 Oliver Popović (2001–03) – 80 games, 14.6 ppg;
 Damir Mršić (2002–03) – 31 games, 7.7 ppg;
 Eurelijus Žukauskas (2002–04) – 78 games, 10 ppg;
 Martin Müürsepp (2001–02, 03–04, 05–06) – 86 games, 11.3 ppg;
 Saulius Štombergas (2003–04, 05–07, 09–10) – 144 games, 11 ppg;
 Stevan Nađfeji (2004–05) – 40 games, 7.4 ppg;
 Kaspars Kambala (2004–05) – 54 games, 14.5 ppg;
 Kšyštof Lavrinovič (2005–07) – 78 games, 12.7 ppg;
 Darjuš Lavrinovič (2006–08) – 68 games, 12.9 ppg;
 Duško Savanović (2006–08) – 71 games, 10.3 ppg;
 Marko Tušek (2007–08) – 36 games, 10.1 ppg;
 Krešimir Lončar (2008–10) – 114 games, 11.8 ppg;
 Marko Popović  (2008–11) – 142 games, 13.9 ppg;
 Vladimir Veremeenko (2008–13) – 249 games, 8.8 ppg;
 Maciej Lampe (2009–11) – 96 games, 15.9 ppg;
 Hasan Rizvić (2010–11) – 64 games, 5.4 ppg;
 Slavko Vraneš (2010–11) – 39 games, 2.6 ppg;
 Boštjan Nachbar (2011–12) – 22 games, 3.6 ppg;
 Ian Vougioukas (2012–13) – 47 games, 10.9 ppg;
 Kostas Kaimakoglou (2012–2021) – 37 games, 12.5 ppg;
 Artūras Milaknis (2015–16)

 Milan Gurović (2004) and  Hüseyin Beşok (2005) shortly were under contract with UNICS Kazan, but never played a single game for the team.

(*) former NBA champions

Head coaches
bold – Olympics, FIBA World and FIBA Europe champions and medalists

 Stanislav Eremin – 2000–06;
 Antanas Sireika – 2006–08;
 Aco Petrović – 2008–09;
 Valdemaras Chomičius – 2009–10;
 Evgeniy Pashutin – 2010–12;
 Aco Petrović – 2012–2013
 Stanislav Eremin – 2013;
 Andrea Trinchieri – 2013–2014
 Argiris Pedoulakis – 2014–2014 
 Evgeniy Pashutin – 2014–2017
 Dimitrios Priftis – 2017–2021
 Velimir Perasović – 2021–

References

External links

 Official Site 
 Eurobasket.com Team Info

Basketball teams in Russia
Sport in Kazan
Basketball teams established in 1991
Basketball teams in the Soviet Union
EuroLeague clubs
1991 establishments in Russia